Anthony Dale Torcato (born October 25, 1979 in Woodland, California) is a former Major League Baseball Player.

Professional career
Torcato was drafted in the 1st round (19th overall) of the 1998 Major League Baseball Draft by the San Francisco Giants. Before being drafted, Torcato signed a letter of intent to play college baseball at UNLV. He made his MLB debut on July 26, 2002 as the starting right fielder for the Giants against the Los Angeles Dodgers and singled to right field in his first at-bat off of the Dodgers Hideo Nomo. He played in parts of four seasons in Major League Baseball and a total of 8 years in the San Francisco Giants organization before becoming a free agent after the 2005 season.

In 2006, Torcato started the baseball season in the Italian Baseball League with Bbc Grosseto, then signed with the Chicago White Sox, who assigned him to the AAA Charlotte Knights.

In 2007, Torcato signed with the Seattle Mariners but was released toward the end of Spring Training.

In 2008, Torcato signed with the Long Beach Armada and the Chico Outlaws of the Golden Baseball League.

In 2021, Torcato became the manager of the Salem-Keizer Volcanoes in the Mavericks Independent Baseball League based out of Salem Oregon.

External links
 Career statistics and player information from Baseball Reference, or The Baseball Cube, or Retrosheet, or Baseball Reference (Minor and Independent Leagues), or Pelota Binaria (Venezuelan Winter League)

1979 births
Living people
Bakersfield Blaze players
Baseball players from California
Charlotte Knights players
Chico Outlaws players
Fresno Grizzlies players
Grosseto Baseball Club players
American expatriate baseball players in Italy
Long Beach Armada players
Major League Baseball outfielders
Pastora de los Llanos players
American expatriate baseball players in Venezuela
People from Woodland, California
Pittsburg Diamonds players
Salem-Keizer Volcanoes players
San Francisco Giants players
San Jose Giants players
Shreveport Captains players
Shreveport Swamp Dragons players